Dmytro Zabirchenko (born 15 June 1984) s a Ukrainian retired basketball player and current coach.

Zabirchenko played with the Ukraine national basketball team at the FIBA EuroBasket 2011 and FIBA EuroBasket 2013.

Coaching career

Starting from 2018, Zabrichenko is the head coach of BC Ternopil which made its debut in the Ukrainian Basketball SuperLeague in 2020–21.

References

Living people
1984 births
BC Azovmash players
BC Budivelnyk players
BC Donetsk players
SC Kryvbas players
BC Sukhumi players
BC Kyiv players
Point guards
Ukrainian men's basketball players
Ukrainian basketball coaches
2014 FIBA Basketball World Cup players
Sportspeople from Donetsk Oblast